Leptospermum rupestre, commonly known as alpine tea-tree or prostrate tea-tree, is a flowering shrub in the myrtle family, Myrtaceae. It is endemic to Tasmania. In alpine areas it assumes a prostrate habit while in subalpine areas it appears as a large shrub.

Description
Leptospermum rupestre is a common alpine and subalpine shrub in Tasmania. The reddish branches become mat-forming over rocks.

Taxonomy and naming
Leptospermum rupestre was first formally described in 1840 by botanist Joseph Dalton Hooker and the description was published in Icones Plantarum. Robert Brown observed it growing on rocky outcrops on Mount Wellington and nearby mountains. The word rupestre is derived from the Latin word rupestris, meaning rocky, referring to the habitat where it was found.

Distribution and habitat
This species is endemic to Tasmania, found growing in a sunny situation on light to medium soils.

References

rupestre
Myrtales of Australia
Flora of Tasmania
Plants described in 1810